Mikel Vesga Arruti (born 8 April 1993) is a Spanish professional footballer who plays for Athletic Bilbao as a defensive midfielder.

Club career
Born in Vitoria-Gasteiz, Álava, Basque Country, Vesga made his debut as a senior with CD Aurrerá de Vitoria in 2012, in the Tercera División. In summer 2013 he moved to Deportivo Alavés, being assigned to the reserves also in the fourth division.

On 1 July 2014, after refusing a new deal, Vesga joined another reserve team, Bilbao Athletic from Segunda División B. Having gained the confidence of coach José Ángel Ziganda he was an ever-present figure during the season, appearing in 38 matches and scoring three goals as they returned to Segunda División after 19 years.

Vesga made his professional debut on 24 August 2015, starting in a 1–0 home loss against Girona FC. He scored his first league goal on 7 February of the following year, the winner in a 3–2 away victory over RCD Mallorca.

On 17 August 2016, after spending the whole pre-season with the first team, Vesga was definitely promoted to the Ernesto Valverde-led side and was assigned the number 12 shirt. He made his La Liga debut four days later, coming on as a second-half substitute for Mikel San José in the 2–1 defeat at Sporting de Gijón.

On 12 September 2016, Vesga extended his contract until 2019, with a buyout clause set at €30 million. The following 25 January, he was loaned to fellow top-tier club Sporting Gijón until the end of the campaign. He scored his first goal in the competition on 15 April 2017, putting the hosts ahead 2–1 in an eventual 3–2 loss against Real Madrid at El Molinón.

On 4 July 2018, Vesga was loaned to CD Leganés also from the Spanish top flight in a season-long move. In January 2021 he agreed to an extension at Athletic running to the summer of 2024, with a release clause of €50 million.

Career statistics

Club

Honours
Athletic Bilbao
Supercopa de España: 2020–21
Copa del Rey runner-up: 2019–20, 2020–21

Notes

References

External links

1993 births
Living people
Footballers from Vitoria-Gasteiz
Spanish footballers
Association football midfielders
La Liga players
Segunda División players
Segunda División B players
Tercera División players
CD Aurrerá de Vitoria footballers
Deportivo Alavés B players
Bilbao Athletic footballers
Athletic Bilbao footballers
Sporting de Gijón players
CD Leganés players
Basque Country international footballers